1945 marked the end of World War II and the fall of Nazi Germany and the Empire of Japan. It is also the only year in which atomic weapons have been used in combat.

Events
Below, the events of World War II have the "WWII" prefix.

January

 January 1 – WWII:
 Germany begins Operation Bodenplatte, an attempt by the Luftwaffe to cripple Allied air forces in the Low Countries.
 Chenogne massacre: German prisoners are allegedly killed by American forces near the village of Chenogne, Belgium.
 January 6 – WWII:  A German offensive recaptures Esztergom, Hungary from the Russians.
 January 12 – WWII: The Soviet Union begins the Vistula–Oder Offensive in Eastern Europe, against the German Army.
 January 13 – WWII: The Soviet Union begins the East Prussian Offensive, to eliminate German forces in East Prussia.
 January 16 – WWII: Adolf Hitler takes residence in the Führerbunker in Berlin.
 January 17
 WWII: The Soviet Union occupies Warsaw, Poland.
 The Holocaust: Swedish diplomat Raoul Wallenberg, who has saved thousands of Jews, is taken into custody by a Soviet patrol during the Siege of Budapest and is never again seen publicly.
 January 18 – The Holocaust: The SS begins the evacuation of Auschwitz concentration camp. Nearly 60,000 prisoners, mostly Jews, are forced to march to other locations in Germany; as many as 15,000 die. The 7,000 too sick to move are left without supplies being distributed.
 January 19 – The Holocaust: Soviet forces liberate the Łódź Ghetto; only 877 Jews of the initial population of 164,000 remain at this time.
 January 20
 Franklin D. Roosevelt is sworn in for a fourth term as President of the United States, the only President ever to exceed two terms.
 Germany begins the Evacuation of East Prussia.
 January 21–22 (night) – At the Grünhagen railroad station, located in East Prussia at this date, two trains, heading for Elbing, collide. At dawn the station is reached by Soviet Army infantry and tanks which destroy the station, killing between 140 and 150 people.
 January 23 – WWII:
 Hungary agrees to an armistice with the Allies.
 German Grand Admiral Karl Dönitz orders the start of Operation Hannibal, the mass evacuation by sea of German troops and civilians from the Courland Pocket, East Prussia and the Polish Corridor, evacuating an estimated 800,000-900,000 German civilians and 350,000 soldiers from advancing Soviet forces.
 Evacuation of Germans from Grünhagen.
 January 24 – WWII: AP war correspondent Joseph Morton, nine OSS men, and four SOE agents are executed by the Germans at Mauthausen concentration camp under Hitler's Commando Order of 1942, which stipulates the immediate execution of all captured Allied commandos or saboteurs without trial, even those in proper uniforms. Morton is the only Allied correspondent to be executed by the Axis during the war.
 January 26 – WWII: 19-year-old U.S. Army Staff Sergeant Audie Murphy sees action at Holtzwihr, France, for which is awarded the Medal of Honor.
 January 27 – The Holocaust: The Soviet Red Army liberates the Auschwitz and Birkenau concentration camps.
 January 30 – WWII:
 , with over 10,000 mainly civilian Germans from Gotenhafen (Gdynia) is sunk in Gdańsk Bay by three torpedoes from Soviet submarine S-13 in the Baltic Sea; up to 9,400, 5,000 of whom are children, are thought to have died – the greatest loss of life in a single ship sinking in history.
 Raid at Cabanatuan: 121 American soldiers and 800 Filipino guerrillas free 813 American prisoners of war from the Japanese-held camp in the city of Cabanatuan, in the Philippines.
 Adolf Hitler makes his last public speech, on broadcast radio, expressing the belief that Germany will triumph.
 January 31 – WWII: The Battle of Hill 170 in the Burma Campaign ends with the British 3rd Commando Brigade defeating the Imperial Japanese Army 54th Division, causing the Japanese Twenty-Eighth Army to withdraw from the Arakan Peninsula.

February

 February – Raymond L. Libby of American Cyanamid's research laboratories, at Stamford, Connecticut, announces a method of orally administering the antibiotic penicillin.
 February 3 – WWII:
 Battle of Manila: United States forces enter the outskirts of Manila to capture it from the Japanese Imperial Army, starting the battle. On February 4, U.S. Army forces liberate Santo Tomas Internment Camp in the city.
 The Soviet Union agrees to enter the Pacific War against Japan, once hostilities against Germany are concluded.
 February 4–11 – WWII: President Franklin D. Roosevelt, Prime Minister of the United Kingdom Winston Churchill and Soviet leader Joseph Stalin hold the Yalta Conference.
 February 7 – WWII: General Douglas MacArthur returns to Manila.
 February 8 – The Alaska Anti-Discrimination Act of 1945, championed by charismatic native leader Elizabeth Peratrovich, is passed by the territorial Senate, after the legislature defeated a previous bill in 1943.
 February 9
 Walter Ulbricht becomes leader of the German Communists in Moscow.
 WWII: "Black Friday": A force of Allied Bristol Beaufighter aircraft suffers heavy casualties in an unsuccessful attack on German destroyer Z33 and escorting vessels sheltering in Førde Fjord, Norway.
 February 10 – WWII: German troopship  is sunk by the Soviet submarine S-13; 3,608 drown.
 February 10–20 – WWII: Operation Kita: The Imperial Japanese Navy returns "Completion Force", containing both its Ise-class battleships, safely from Singapore to Kure in Japan despite Allied attacks.
 February 13 – WWII:
 The Budapest Offensive and the Siege of Budapest end with Nazi troops surrendering Budapest (Hungary) to Soviet-Romanian forces.
 Bombing of Dresden (Germany) by the British Royal Air Force and United States Army Air Forces; 25,000-35,000 are estimated to have died.
 February 16 – WWII:
 The Bombing of Wesel begins, destroying 97% of the town over three days.
 American and Filipino ground forces land on Corregidor Island in the Philippines.
 Combined American and Filipino forces recapture the Bataan Peninsula.
 Venezuela declares war on Germany.
 February 19–20 – 980 (Actual figure is disputed) Japanese soldiers die as a result of being attacked by long saltwater crocodiles in Ramree, Burma.
 February 19 – WWII: Battle of Iwo Jima – About 30,000 United States Marines land on Iwo Jima.
 February 21 – The last V-2 rocket is launched from Peenemünde.
 February 22 – WWII:
 Italian Front: The Battle of Monte Castello ends, after nearly three months of fighting, Brazilian troops expel German forces from a pivot point in the (Tuscan) North Apennines, where their artillery was impeding the advance of Eighth British Army toward Bologna.
 Uruguay declares war on Germany and Japan.
 February 23 – WWII:
 Battle of Iwo Jima: A group of United States Marines reach the top of Mount Suribachi on the island, and are photographed raising the American flag. The photo, Raising the Flag on Iwo Jima (taken by Joe Rosenthal), later wins a Pulitzer Prize.
 The 11th Airborne Division, with Filipino guerrillas, free the captives of the Los Baños internment camp.
 The capital of the Philippines, Manila, is liberated by combined American and Filipino ground troops. American and Filipino troops enter Intramuros.
 The German garrison in Poznań capitulates to Red Army and Polish troops.
 Bombing of Pforzheim: The heaviest of a series of bombing raids on Pforzheim, Germany by Allied aircraft is carried out by the British Royal Air Force. As many as 17,600 people, or 31.4% of the town's population, are killed in the raid and about 83% of the town's buildings destroyed, two-thirds of its complete area and between 80 and 100% of the inner city.
 Turkey joins the war on the side of the Allies.
 February 24 – Egyptian Premier Ahmad Mahir Pasha is assassinated in Parliament after declaring war on Germany and Japan.
 February 27 – The Bombing of Mainz results in 1,209 confirmed dead; 80% of the city is destroyed.
 February 28 – In Bucharest, a violent demonstration takes place, during which the Bolşevic group opens fire on the army and protesters. In response, Andrei Y. Vishinsky, USSR vice commissioner of foreign affairs and president of the Allied Control Commission for Romania, travels to Bucharest to compel Nicolae Rădescu to resign as premier.

March

 March 1 – President Franklin D. Roosevelt gives what will be his last address to a joint session of the United States Congress, reporting on the Yalta Conference.
 March 2
 Former U.S. Vice-president Henry A. Wallace starts his term of office as United States Secretary of Commerce, serving under President Franklin D. Roosevelt.
 The rocket-propelled Bachem Ba 349 Natter is first test launched at Stetten am kalten Markt. The launch fails and the pilot, Lothar Sieber, dies.
 March 3 – WWII:
 Finland declares war on the Axis powers.
 United States and Filipino troops take Manila, Philippines.
 Pawłokoma massacre: A Polish Home Army unit massacres between 150 and 500 Ukrainian civilians in the Polish village of Pawłokoma.
 Bombing of the Bezuidenhout: The British Royal Air Force accidentally bombs the Bezuidenhout neighbourhood in The Hague, Netherlands, killing 511 people.
 March 4 – In the United Kingdom, Princess Elizabeth (later Queen Elizabeth II), joins the Auxiliary Territorial Service (ATS) as a truck driver/mechanic in London.
 March 5 – WWII: Brazilian troops take Castelnuovo (Vergato), in the last operations of the Allied Spring 1945 offensive in Italy.
 March 6
 A Communist-led government is formed in Romania under Petru Groza, following Soviet intervention.
 Resistance fighters accidentally ambush and attempt to execute SS general Hanns Albin Rauter, the arch-persecutor of the Dutch.
 March 7 – WWII: At the end of Operation Lumberjack, American troops seize the Ludendorff Bridge over the Rhine at Remagen, Germany and begin to cross; in the next 10 days, 25,000 troops with equipment are able to cross.
 March 8
 Josip Broz Tito forms a Provisional Government of the Democratic Federal Yugoslavia, in the Kingdom of Yugoslavia.
 Nazi authorities kill 117 Dutch men, in reprisal for the attempted murder of Hanns Albin Rauter.
 Operation Sunrise: Waffen-SS General Karl Wolff meets with Allen Welsh Dulles of the United States Office of Strategic Services at Lucerne, Switzerland, to negotiate the surrender of the Axis forces in Italy to the Allies.
 March 9–10 – WWII: Bombing of Tokyo: USAAF B-29 bombers attack Tokyo, Japan, with incendiary bombs, killing 100,000 citizens in the firebombing. It is the single most destructive conventional air attack of the war.
 March 11
 The Empire of Japan establishes the Empire of Vietnam, a puppet state which will last only until August 23, with Bảo Đại as its ruler.
 The Sammarinese general election gives San Marino the world's first democratically elected communist government, which will hold power until 1957.
 March 12 – WWII: Swinemünde is destroyed by the USAAF, killing an estimated 8,000 to 23,000 civilians, mostly refugees saved by Operation Hannibal.
 March 15–31 – WWII: The Soviet Red Army carries out the Upper Silesian Offensive.
 March 15 – The 17th Academy Awards ceremony is held, broadcast via radio in the United States for the first time. Best Picture goes to Going My Way.
 March 16 – WWII:
 The Battle of Iwo Jima unofficially ends.
 The Bombing of Würzburg, as part of the Allied strategic bombing campaign against Nazi Germany, destroys 89% of the city and causes 4,000 deaths.
 March 17 – WWII: Kobe, Japan is fire-bombed by 331 B-29 bombers, killing over 8,000 people.
 March 18 – WWII: 1,250 American bombers attack Berlin.
 March 19 – WWII:
 Adolf Hitler issues the Nero Decree: ordering that all industries, military installations, machine shops, transportation facilities and communications facilities in Germany be destroyed.
 Off the coast of Japan, bombers hit the aircraft carrier USS Franklin, killing about 800 of her crewmen and crippling the ship.
 March 21 – WWII:
 British troops liberate Mandalay, Burma.
 Bulgarian and Soviet troops successfully defend the north bank of the Drava River, as the Battle of the Transdanubian Hills concludes.
 March 22
 The Arab League is formed, with the adoption of a charter in Cairo, Egypt.
 The Cathedral and the historic city-centre of Hildesheim in Germany are destroyed in an air raid.
 March 24
 WWII: Operation Varsity – Two airborne divisions capture bridges across the Rhine River to aid the Allied advance.
 The cartoon character Sylvester the cat debuts in Life with Feathers.
 March 26 – WWII: The Battle of Iwo Jima officially ends, with the destruction of the remaining areas of Japanese resistance, although there are Japanese holdouts here until 1949.
 March 27 – WWII:
 The United States Army Air Forces begins Operation Starvation, laying naval mines in many of Japan's seaways.
 Argentina declares war on Germany and Japan.
 March 29
 WWII: The Red Army almost destroys the German 4th Army, in the Heiligenbeil Pocket in East Prussia.
 The "Clash of Titans": George Mikan and Bob Kurland duel at Madison Square Garden in New York, as Oklahoma State University defeats DePaul 52–44 in basketball.
 March 30 – WWII:
 The Red Army pushes most of the Axis forces out of Hungary into Austria.
 American official Alger Hiss is congratulated in Moscow for his part in bringing the positions of the Western powers and the Soviet Union closer to each other, at the Yalta Conference.

April

 April 1 – WWII: Battle of Okinawa: The Tenth United States Army lands on Okinawa.
 April 4 – WWII:
 American troops liberate their first Nazi concentration camp, Ohrdruf extermination camp in Germany.
 The Red Army enters Bratislava and pushes to the outskirts of Vienna, taking it on April 13, after several days of intense fighting.
 April 6 – WWII:
 Sarajevo is liberated from Nazi Germany and the Independent State of Croatia (a fascist puppet state), by Yugoslav Partisans.
 The Battle of Slater's Knoll on Bougainville Island concludes, with a decisive victory for the Australian Army's 7th Brigade.
 Allied forces reach Merkers Salt Mines in Thuringia, where gold reserves of the Nazi German Reichsbank are stored.
 April 7 – WWII:
 The only flight of the German ramming unit known as Sonderkommando Elbe takes place, resulting in the loss of some 24 B-17s and B-24s of the United States Eighth Air Force.
  and nine other warships take part in Operation Ten-Go, a suicide attack on Allied forces engaged in the Battle of Okinawa.
 Kantarō Suzuki becomes Prime Minister of Japan.
 April 8 – The SS begins to evacuate the Buchenwald concentration camp; inmates in the Buchenwald Resistance call for American aid, and overpower and kill the remaining guards.
 April 9
 WWII: The Battle of Königsberg, in East Prussia, ends with Soviet forces capturing the city.
 Abwehr conspirators Wilhelm Canaris, Hans Oster and Hans von Dohnányi are hanged at Flossenberg concentration camp, along with pastor Dietrich Bonhoeffer.
 Johann Georg Elser, would-be assassin of Adolf Hitler, is executed at Dachau concentration camp.
 April 10 – WWII: Visoko is liberated by the 7th, 9th and 17th Krajina Brigades from the Tenth Division of Yugoslav Partisan forces.
 April 11 – Buchenwald concentration camp is liberated by the United States Army.
 April 12
Vice President Harry S. Truman is sworn in as the 33rd President of the United States, and that evening in the White House, following the sudden death of President Franklin D. Roosevelt earlier in the day.
 WWII: The U.S. Ninth Army under General William H. Simpson crosses the Elbe River astride Magdeburg, and reaches Tangermünde — only 50 miles from Berlin.
 April 14 – WWII:
 The First Canadian Army assumes military control of the Netherlands, where German forces are trapped in the Atlantic Wall fortifications along the coastline.
 Razing of Friesoythe: The 4th Canadian (Armoured) Division deliberately destroys the German town of Friesoythe, on the orders of Major General Christopher Vokes.
 April 15 – WWII:
 The Bergen-Belsen concentration camp is liberated by British and Canadian forces.
 The Canadian First Army reaches the coast in the northern Netherlands, and captures Arnhem.
 April 16 – WWII:
 The Battle of Berlin begins, opening with the Battle of the Oder–Neisse and the Battle of the Seelow Heights.
 Canadian forces take Harlingen and occupy Leeuwarden and Groningen in the Netherlands.
  is sunk by Soviet submarine L-3 in the Baltic Sea while evacuating German troops and civilians as part of Operation Hannibal; 7,000–8,000 drown.
 Death marches from Flossenbürg concentration camp begin.
 April 17 – WWII:
 Brazilian forces liberate the town of Montese, Italy, from German forces.
 Inundation of the Wieringermeer in the Netherlands by occupying German forces.
 April 18 – American war correspondent Ernie Pyle is killed by Japanese machine gun fire on the island of Ie Shima off Okinawa.
 April 19 – Rodgers and Hammerstein's Carousel, a musical play based on Ferenc Molnár's Liliom, opens on Broadway, and becomes their second long-running stage classic.
 April 20 – WWII: On his 56th birthday, Adolf Hitler leaves his Führerbunker, to decorate a group of Hitler Youth soldiers in Berlin. It will be his last trip to the surface from his underground bunker.
 April 22 – WWII:
 Heinrich Himmler, through Folke Bernadotte, Count of Wisborg, puts forth an offer of German surrender to the Western Allies, but not the Soviet Union.
 Adolf Hitler finally concedes defeat in the Führerbunker after learning that SS-Obergruppenführer Felix Steiner cannot mobilize enough men to launch a counterattack on the Soviet forces which have completely surrounded Berlin.
 April 23 – WWII:
 Hermann Göring sends the Göring Telegram to Hitler, seeking confirmation that he should take over leadership of Germany, in accordance with the decree of June 29, 1941. Hitler regards this as treason.
 The main Flossenbürg concentration camp is liberated by the United States Army.
 April 24 – Retreating German troops destroy all the bridges over the Adige in Verona, including the historic Ponte di Castelvecchio and Ponte Pietra.
 April 25
 Founding negotiations for the United Nations begin in San Francisco.
 WWII – Elbe Day: United States and Soviet troops link up at the Elbe River, cutting Germany in two.
 April 25–26 – WWII: The last major strategic bombing raid by RAF Bomber Command, the destruction of the oil refinery at Tønsberg in southern Norway, is carried out by 107 Avro Lancasters.
 April 26 – WWII:
 Battle of Bautzen: The last "successful" German panzer-offensive in Bautzen ends with the city recaptured.
 The British 3rd Infantry Division, under General Whistler, captures Bremen.
 Nazi surrenders mean the British and Canadians now control the German border with Switzerland, from Basle to Lake Constance.
 April 27
 The last German formations withdraw from Finland to Norway. The Lapland War and thus, World War II in Finland, comes to an end and the Raising the Flag on the Three-Country Cairn photograph is taken.
 U.S. Ordnance troops find the coffins of Frederick William I of Prussia, Frederick the Great, Paul von Hindenburg, and his wife, in a salt mine in Germany.
 April 28
 The bodies of Benito Mussolini, his mistress, Clara Petacci, and other followers are hung by their heels at a gas station in the public square of Milan, Piazzale Loreto, following their execution by Italian partisans after an attempt to flee the country.
 The Canadian First Army captures Emden and Wilhelmshaven.
 April 29
 At the royal palace in Caserta, Lieutenant-Colonel Viktor von Schweinitz (representing General Heinrich von Vietinghoff) and SS-Obersturmbannführer Eugen Wenner (representing Waffen-SS General Karl Wolff) sign an unconditional instrument of surrender for all Axis powers forces in Italy, taking effect on May 2. Italian General Rodolfo Graziani orders the Esercito Nazionale Repubblicano forces under his command to lay down their arms.
 Dachau concentration camp is surrendered to U.S. forces, who kill SS guards at the camp and the nearby hamlet of Webling.
 Brazilian forces liberate the commune of Fornovo di Taro, Italy, from German forces.
 Operation Manna: British Avro Lancaster bombers drop food into the Netherlands to prevent the starvation of the civilian population.
 Soviet soldiers hoist the Red flag over the Reich Chancellery in Berlin.
 Adolf Hitler marries his longtime mistress Eva Braun, in a closed civil ceremony in the Berlin Führerbunker, and signs his last will and testament.
 April 30 – Death of Adolf Hitler: Adolf Hitler and his wife of one day, Eva Braun, commit suicide as the Red Army approaches the Führerbunker in Berlin. Großadmiral Karl Dönitz succeeds Hitler as President of Germany (Reichspräsident) and Joseph Goebbels succeeds as Chancellor of Germany (Reichskanzler), in accordance with Hitler's political testament of the previous day.

May 

 May 1 – WWII:
 Reichssender Hamburg's Flensburg radio station announces that Hitler has died in battle, "fighting up to his last breath against Bolshevism."
 Joseph Goebbels and his wife Magda commit suicide, after killing their six children. Karl Dönitz appoints Lutz Graf Schwerin von Krosigk as the new Chancellor of Germany, in the Flensburg Government.
 Troops of the Yugoslav 4th Army, together with the Slovene 9th Corpus NOV, enter Trieste.
 Mass suicide in Demmin: An estimated 700–2,500 suicides take place, after 80% of the town has been destroyed by the Soviets during the past three days.
 May 2 – WWII:
 The Soviet Union announces the fall of Berlin.
 Lübeck is liberated by the British Army.
 The surrender of Axis troops in Italy comes into effect.
 A Holocaust death march from Dachau to the Austrian border is halted under two kilometers west of Waakirchen by the segregated, all-Nisei 522nd Field Artillery Battalion of the U.S. Army in southern Bavaria, saving several hundred prisoners.
 Troops of the New Zealand Army 2nd Division enter Trieste a day after the Yugoslavs; the German Army in Trieste surrenders to the New Zealand Army.
 Following the death or resignation of the Hitler Cabinet in Germany, the Schwerin von Krosigk cabinet first meets.
 Neuengamme concentration camp near Hamburg is evacuated at about this date.
 Expatriate American poet Ezra Pound is arrested by the Italian resistance movement but soon released by them as of no interest; on May 5 he turns himself in to the United States Army and is imprisoned as a traitor.
 May 3 – WWII:
 The prison ships Cap Arcona (5,000 dead), Thielbek (2,750 dead) and Deutschland (all survive) are sunk by the British Royal Air Force in Lübeck Bay.
 Rocket scientist Wernher von Braun and 120 members of his team surrender to U.S. forces (later going on to help start the U.S. space program).
 German Protestant theologian Gerhard Kittel is arrested by the French forces in Tübingen, Germany.
 May 4 – WWII:
 German surrender at Lüneburg Heath: All German armed forces in northwest Germany, Denmark and the Netherlands surrender unconditionally to Field Marshal Bernard Montgomery, effective on May 5 at 08:00 hours British Double (and German) Summer Time.
 The Netherlands is liberated by British and Canadian troops.
 Denmark is liberated.
 Admiral Karl Dönitz orders all U-boats to cease offensive operations and return to bases in Norway.
 The Holy Crown of Hungary is found in Mattsee, Austria, by the United States Army 86th Infantry Division. The U.S. government keeps the crown in Fort Knox for safekeeping from the Soviets until it is returned to Hungary on January 6 1978.
 German auxiliary cruiser Orion is sunk on her way to Copenhagen carrying refugees, with a loss of over 3,800 lives.
 May 5 – WWII:
 Prague uprising: Prague rises up against occupying Nazi forces, encouraged by radio broadcasts (giving rise to the Battle for Czech Radio).
 The US 11th Armored Division liberates the prisoners of Mauthausen concentration camp, including Simon Wiesenthal.
 Canadian soldiers liberate the city of Amsterdam from Nazi occupation.
 A Japanese fire balloon kills six people, Elsie Mitchell and five children, near Bly, Oregon, when it explodes as they drag it from the woods. These are the only people killed by an enemy attack on the American mainland during WWII.
 May 6
 WWII: Mildred Gillars ("Axis Sally") delivers her last propaganda broadcast to Allied troops (the first was on December 11, 1941).
 Holocaust: Ebensee concentration camp in Austria is liberated by troops of the 80th Division (United States).
 May 6–7 – The government of the Independent State of Croatia, the Nazi-affiliated fascist puppet state established in occupied Yugoslavia, flees Zagreb for a location near Klagenfurt in Austria, but is captured in the Bleiburg repatriations that then leads to mass executions.
 May 7 – WWII:
 At 02:41, General Alfred Jodl signs the unconditional German Instrument of Surrender in SHAEF HQ at Reims, France, to end Germany's participation in the war. Surrender is effective on May 8 at 23:01 hours Central European Time (00:01 hours May 9 German Summer Time).
 Numerous RAF Lancasters land in Germany to repatriate British prisoners of war. Some 4,500 ex-POWs are flown back to Great Britain over the next 24 hours.
 May 8 – WWII:
 Victory in Europe Day (VE Day) is observed by the western European powers as Nazi Germany surrenders, marking the end of WWII in Europe.
 Shortly before midnight (May 9 Moscow time) the final German Instrument of Surrender is signed at the seat of the Soviet Military Administration in Berlin-Karlshorst, attended by Allied representatives.
 Canadian troops move into Amsterdam, after German troops surrender.
 The surrender of the Dodecanese is signed in Symi.
 The Prague uprising ends with a ceasefire.
 The Eighth British Army, together with Slovene partisan troops and a motorized detachment of the Yugoslav 4th Army, arrives in Carinthia and Klagenfurt. The Croatian Armed Forces of the Independent State of Croatia are ordered by their commanders not to surrender to the Yugoslav Partisans, but to attempt to retreat to Austria and surrender to the British, part of the events leading to the Bleiburg repatriations.
 Hermann Göring surrenders himself to the United States Army near Radstadt.
 May 8–29 – Sétif and Guelma massacre: in Algeria, thousands die as French troops and released Italian POWs kill an estimated 6,000 to 40,000 Algerian citizens.
 May 9 – WWII:
 The Soviet Union marks VE Day as the Red Army enters Prague.
 Vidkun Quisling and other members of the collaborationist Quisling regime in Norway surrender to the Resistance (Milorg) and police at Møllergata 19 in Oslo, as part of the legal purge in Norway after World War II.
 General Alexander Löhr, Commander of German Army Group E near Topolšica, Slovenia, signs the capitulation of German occupation troops.
 Liberation of the German-occupied Channel Islands: British forces take the surrender of the occupying troops, with Royal Navy ships HMS Bulldog arriving in St Peter Port, Guernsey, and HMS Beagle in St Helier, Jersey.
 May 10 – WWII: Liberation of the German-occupied Channel Islands: Occupation of Sark ends, with British forces taking the surrender of the occupying troops and leaving them under the orders of Dame Sibyl Hathaway.
 May 12 – Argentinian labour leader José Peter declares the Meat Industry Workers Federation dissolved.
 May 14–15 – WWII: Battle of Poljana: The last battle of the War in Europe is fought at Poljana near Slovenj Gradec, Slovenia.
 May 15 – WWII: Surrender at Bleiburg – Retreating troops of the Croatian Armed Forces of the former puppet Independent State of Croatia (intermingled with fleeing civilians) attempt to surrender to the British Army at Bleiburg, but are directed to surrender to Yugoslav Partisans, who open fire on them. The remainder, after orders are given by Tito, are force-marched through Croatia and Serbia, interned or massacred, with thousands dying.
 May 16 – WWII: Liberation of the German-occupied Channel Islands: Occupation of Alderney ends, with British forces taking the surrender of the occupying troops, the civilian population having been evacuated.
 May 23
 The Flensburg Government is dissolved by the Allies, and German President Karl Dönitz and German Chancellor Lutz Graf Schwerin von Krosigk are arrested by British RAF Regiment personnel at Flensburg. They are respectively the last German Head of state and Head of government until 1949.
 Heinrich Himmler, former head of the Nazi SS, commits suicide in British custody.
 May 28 – U.S.-born Irish-raised William Joyce ("Lord Haw-Haw") is captured on the German border. He is later charged in London with high treason for his English-language wartime broadcasts from German radio, convicted, and then hanged in January 1946.
 May 29
 German communists, led by Walter Ulbricht, arrive in Berlin.
 Dutch painter Han van Meegeren is arrested for collaboration with the Nazis, but the "Dutch Golden Age" paintings he has sold to Hermann Göring (Koch) are later proved to be his own fakes.
 May 30 – The Iranian government demands that all Soviet and British troops leave the country.
 May – Interpol (being headquartered in Berlin) effectively ceases to exist (it is recreated on June 3, 1946).

June

 June 1 – The British take over Lebanon and Syria.
 June 5 – The Allied Control Council, the military occupation governing body of Germany, formally takes power.
 June 7 – King Haakon VII of Norway returns to Norway five years to the day after leaving for exile in Britain.
 June 11
 William Lyon Mackenzie King is re-elected as Canadian prime minister.
 The Franck Committee recommends against a surprise nuclear bombing of Japan.
 June 12 – The Yugoslav Army leaves Trieste, leaving the New Zealand Army in control.
 June 21 – WWII: The Battle of Okinawa ends, with U.S. occupation of the island until 1972.
 June 24 – WWII: A victory parade is held in Red Square in Moscow.
 June 25 – Seán T. O'Kelly is elected the second President of Ireland.
 June 26 – The United Nations Charter is signed in San Francisco.
 June 29 – Czechoslovakia cedes Carpathian Ruthenia to the Soviet Union.
 June 30 – John von Neumann's First Draft of a Report on the EDVAC is distributed, containing the first published description of the logical design of a computer, with stored-program and instruction data stored in the same address space within the memory (von Neumann architecture).

July

 July 1 – WWII: Germany is divided between the Allied occupation forces.
 July 2 – The 1945 Sheikh Bashir Rebellion breaks out in Burao and Erigavo in British Somaliland, led by Sheikh Bashir, a Somali religious leader. 
 July 4 – Brazilian cruiser Bahia is sunk by an accidentally induced explosion, killing more than 300 and stranding the survivors in shark-infested waters.
 July 5
 The 1945 United Kingdom general election is held, though some constituencies delay their polls for local holiday reasons. Counting of votes and declaration of results are delayed until July 26 to allow for voting by the large number of service personnel still overseas.
 John Curtin, 14th Prime Minister of Australia, dies in office from heart failure at the age of 60. He is briefly replaced by his deputy Frank Forde, who serves as the 15th Prime Minister until a Labor Party leadership election is held to replace Curtin.
 WWII: The Philippines are declared liberated.
 July 6–7 – Schio massacre: 54 prisoners, mostly fascist sympathisers, are killed by members of the Italian resistance movement in Schio.
 July 8 – WWII: Harry S. Truman is informed that Japan will talk peace if it can retain the reign of the Emperor.
 July 12 – Ben Chifley is elected leader of the Labor Party, and consequently becomes the 16th Prime Minister of Australia, defeating Frank Forde as well as Norman Makin and H.V. Evatt. As a result, Forde becomes the shortest serving Prime Minister in Australian history; nevertheless, he retains his post as Deputy Leader.
 July 14 – WWII: Italy declares war on Japan.
 July 16
 The Trinity Test, the first of an atomic bomb, using about six kilograms of plutonium, succeeds in unleashing an explosion equivalent to that of 22 kilotons of TNT.
 A train collision near Munich, Germany kills 102 war prisoners.
 July 17–August 2 – WWII: Potsdam Conference – At Potsdam, the three main Allied leaders hold their final summit of the war. President Truman officially informs Stalin that the U.S. has a powerful new weapon.
 July 21 – WWII: President Harry S. Truman approves the order for atomic bombs to be used against Japan.
 July 23 – WWII: French marshal Philippe Pétain, who headed the Vichy government during WWII, goes on trial for treason.
 July 26
 Winston Churchill resigns as Prime Minister of the United Kingdom, after his Conservative Party is soundly defeated by the Labour Party in the 1945 general election. Clement Attlee becomes the new Prime Minister. It is the first time that Labour has governed Britain with a majority in the House of Commons.
 The Potsdam Declaration demands Japan's unconditional surrender; Article 12, permitting Japan to retain the reign of the Emperor, has been deleted by President Truman.
 July 27 – WWII: Bombing of Aomori – Two USAAF B-29s drop a total of 60,000 leaflets on the city of Aomori, Japan, warning civilians of an air raid and urging them to leave immediately.
 July 28 - WWII: Japan ambiguously rejects the Potsdam Declaration.
 July 29
 The BBC Light Programme radio station is launched in the United Kingdom, aimed at mainstream light entertainment and music.
 WWII: Bombing of Aomori: The Japanese city of Aomori is firebombed by 63 USAAF B-29 heavy bombers, killing 1,767 civilians and destroying 18,045 homes.
Some 900 survivors jump into the sea and are adrift for up to four days. Nearly 600 die before help arrives. Captain Charles B. McVay III of the cruiser is later court-martialed and convicted; in 2000, he is posthumously exonerated.

August

 August 6 – WWII: Atomic bombing of Hiroshima: United States Boeing B-29 Superfortress Enola Gay drops a uranium-235 atomic bomb, codenamed "Little Boy", on the Japanese city of Hiroshima at 8:15 a.m. local time, resulting in between 90,000 and 146,000 deaths.
 August 7 – U.S. President Harry Truman announces the successful atomic bombing of Hiroshima, while he is returning from the Potsdam Conference aboard the U.S. Navy heavy cruiser , in the middle of the Atlantic Ocean.
 August 8
 The United Nations Charter is ratified by the United States Senate, and this nation becomes the third to join the new international organization.
 WWII: The Soviet Union declares war on Japan.
 August 9 – WWII:
 Atomic bombing of Nagasaki: United States B-29 Bockscar drops a plutonium-239 atomic bomb, codenamed "Fat Man", on the Japanese city of Nagasaki at 11:02 a.m. local time, resulting in between 39,000 and 80,000 deaths.
 The Soviet–Japanese War opens: The Soviet Union begins its army offensive against Japan, in the northern part of the Japanese-held Chinese region of Manchuria.
 August 10 – WWII: Japan offers to surrender to the Allies, "provided this does not prejudice the sovereignty of the Emperor".
 August 11
 WWII: The Allies reply to the Japanese surrender offer by stating that Emperor Hirohito will be subject to the authority of the Supreme Commander of the Allied Forces.
 The Holocaust: Kraków pogrom – Róża Berger is shot dead by Polish militia.
 August 11–25 – Soviet troops complete the occupation of Sakhalin.
 August 13 – The Zionist World Congress approaches the British government to discuss the founding of the country of Israel.
 August 14 – WWII: Emperor Hirohito accepts the terms of the Potsdam Declaration. His recorded announcement of this is smuggled out of the Tokyo Imperial Palace. At 19:00 hrs in Washington, D.C. (23:00 GMT), U.S. President Harry S. Truman announces the Japanese surrender.
 August 15
 WWII:
 Bombing of Kumagaya, Japan, by the United States using conventional bombs, beginning at 00:23.
 Hirohito surrender broadcast (Gyokuon-hōsō): Emperor Hirohito's announcement of the unconditional surrender of Japan is broadcast on the radio a little after noon (12:00 Japan Standard Time is 03:00 GMT). This is probably the first time an Emperor of Japan has been heard by the common people. Delivered in formal classical Japanese, without directly referring to surrender and following official censorship of the country's weak position, the recorded speech is not immediately easily understood by ordinary people. The Allies call this day Victory over Japan Day (V-J Day). This ends the period of Japanese expansionism, and begins the period of the Occupation of Japan. Korea gains independence.
 The August Revolution in Vietnam begins, with the Viet Minh taking over the capital Hanoi, taking advantage of the collapse of Japanese power.
 The Provisional International Civil Aviation Organization is founded, as a specialized agency of the United Nations.
 August 17
 Philippines President José P. Laurel issues an Executive Proclamation putting an end to the Second Philippine Republic, thus ending his term as President of the Philippines.
 Proclamation of Indonesian Independence: Indonesian nationalists Sukarno and Mohammad Hatta declare the independence of the Republic of Indonesia, with Sukarno as president and Mohammad Hatta as vice-president, igniting the Indonesian National Revolution against the Dutch Empire.
 August 18 – WWII: Death of Subhas Chandra Bose: Indian nationalist leader Subhas Chandra Bose is killed as a result of his overloaded Japanese plane crashing in Japanese Taiwan.
 August 19 – Chinese Civil War: Mao Zedong and Chiang Kai-shek meet in Chongqing to discuss an end to hostilities between the Communists and the Nationalists.
 August 23 – Soviet–Japanese War: Joseph Stalin orders the detention of Japanese prisoners of war in the Soviet Union.
 August 25 – Bảo Đại abdicates as Emperor of Vietnam, ending 2,000 years of dynastic and monarchic rule in the country and 143 years of the Nguyễn dynasty.
 August 30 – WWII: Vietnam's capital Hanoi is taken by the Viet Minh, which ends the French occupation in what becomes North Vietnam, and thus the southern provinces become South Vietnam. This ends the August Revolution.
 August 31
  WWII: Allied troops arrest German field marshal Walther von Brauchitsch.
 A team at American Cyanamid's Lederle Laboratories, Pearl River, New York, led by Yellapragada Subbarow, announces they have obtained folic acid in a pure crystalline form. This vitamin is abundant in green leaf vegetables, liver, kidney, and yeast.

September

 September 2 – World War II ends:
 Japanese general Tomoyuki Yamashita surrenders to Filipino and American forces at Kiangan, Ifugao.
 The final official Japanese Instrument of Surrender is accepted by the Supreme Allied Commander, General Douglas MacArthur, and Fleet Admiral Chester W. Nimitz for the United States, and delegates from the United Kingdom, Australia, New Zealand, the Netherlands, China, and others from a Japanese delegation led by Mamoru Shigemitsu, on board the American battleship USS Missouri in Tokyo Bay.
 General Douglas MacArthur is given the title of Supreme Commander Allied Powers, and is also tasked with the occupation of Japan.
 The Democratic Republic of Vietnam is officially established, by Ho Chi Minh.
 September 4 – WWII: Japanese forces surrender on Wake Island, after hearing word of their country's surrender.
 September 5
 Iva Toguri D'Aquino, a Japanese American suspected of being wartime radio propagandist "Tokyo Rose", is arrested in Yokohama.
 Russian code clerk Igor Gouzenko comes forward with numerous documents implicating the Soviet Union in many spy rings in North America, both in the United States and in Canada.
 September 8 – U.S. troops occupy southern Korea, while the Soviet Union occupies the north, with the dividing line being the 38th parallel of latitude. This arrangement proves to be the indirect beginning of a divided Korea, which will lead to the Korean War in 1950.
 September 9 – Chairman of the Nationalist Government of China Chiang Kai-shek officially accepts the Japanese capitulation at Nanking.
 September 10 – Vidkun Quisling is sentenced to death as a Nazi collaborator in Norway.
 September 11
 Hideki Tojo, Japanese prime minister during most of WWII, attempts suicide to avoid facing a war crimes tribunal.
 Radio Republik Indonesia starts broadcasting.
 The Batu Lintang camp in Sarawak, Borneo is liberated by Australian forces.
 September 12 – The Japanese Army formally surrenders to the British in Singapore.
 September 18
 Typhoon Makurazaki kills 3,746 people in Japan.
 The Japanese Army in Central China officially surrenders to the Chinese, in Wuhan.
 September 20 – Mohandas Gandhi and Jawaharlal Nehru demand that all British troops depart India.
 September 24 – Postwar anti-Jewish violence in Slovakia: The Topoľčany pogrom is carried out in Czechoslovakia.

October

 October – Arthur C. Clarke puts forward the idea of a geosynchronous communications satellite, in a Wireless World magazine article.
 October 1–15 – Operation Backfire: Three A4 rockets are launched near Cuxhaven, in a demonstration to Allied forces.
 October 2 – George Albert Smith becomes president of the Church of Jesus Christ of Latter-day Saints.
 October 4 – The Partizan Belgrade sports club is founded in Belgrade, Serbia.
 October 5 – Hollywood Black Friday: A strike by the Set Decorator's Union in Hollywood results in a riot.
 October 8–15 – Hadamar Trial: Personnel of the Hadamar Euthanasia Centre, now in the American zone of Allied-occupied Germany, are the first to be tried for systematic extermination in Nazi Germany.
 October 9 – Former prime minister Pierre Laval is sentenced to death, for collaboration with the Nazis in Vichy France.
 October 10 – The Nazi Party is dissolved by the Allied Powers.
 October 14 – Czechoslovakia: A new provisional national assembly is elected.
 October 15–21 – The Fifth Pan-African Congress is held in Manchester.
 October 16 – The Food and Agriculture Organization is established at a meeting in Quebec City, as a specialized agency of the United Nations.
 October 17 – A massive number of people, headed for the General Confederation of Labour (Argentina), gather in the Plaza de Mayo in Buenos Aires to demand Juan Perón's release. This is known to the Peronists as the Día de la lealtad (Loyalty Day) and considered the founding day of Peronism.
 October 18 – Isaías Medina Angarita, president of Venezuela, is overthrown by a military coup.
 October 19 – Members of the Indonesian People's Army attack Anglo-Dutch forces in Indonesia.
 October 20 – Mongolians vote for independence from China.
 October 21 – Women's suffrage: Women are allowed to vote in the French Legislative Election for the first time.
 October 22 – Rómulo Betancourt is named provisional president of Venezuela.
 October 24
 The United Nations is founded by ratification of its Charter, by 29 nations.
 The International Court of Justice ("World Court") is established by the United Nations Charter.
 Norwegian Nazi leader Vidkun Quisling is executed by firing squad, for treason against Norway.
 October 25
 WWII: Japanese armed forces in Taiwan surrender to the Allies.
 Getúlio Vargas is deposed as president in Brazil; José Linhares is named temporary president.
 Osijek prison massacre by Yugoslav secret police.
 October 27–November 20 – Indonesian National Revolution: Battle of Surabaya – Pro-independence Indonesian soldiers and militia fight British and British Indian troops in Surabaya.
 October 29
 Getúlio Vargas resigns as president of Brazil.
 At Gimbels Department Store in New York City, the first ballpoint pens go on sale at $12.50 each.
 October 30 – The undivided country of India joins the United Nations.

November

 November 1
  International Labour Organization's new constitution comes into effect.
 Telechron introduces the model 8H59 Musalarm, the first clock radio.
 November 5 – Colombia joins the United Nations.
 November 6 – Indonesians reject an offer of autonomy from the Dutch.
 November 9 – Soo Bahk Do and Moo Duk Kwan martial arts are founded in Korea.
 November 10 – Indonesian National Revolution: Battle of Surabaya – Following the killing of British officer Brigadier A. W. S. Mallaby on October 30, the British Indian Army (in support of its allied Dutch colonial administration) begins an advance on Surabaya in the Dutch East Indies against Indonesian nationalists; although most of the city is retaken in 3 days of heavy fighting, the strength of the resistance leads to today being celebrated as Heroes' Day (Hari Pahlawan) in Indonesia.
 November 11 – 1945 Yugoslavian parliamentary election: Marshal Josip Broz Tito and the People's Front win a decisive majority (90%) in the Yugoslavian Assembly.
 November 15
 Harry S. Truman, Clement Attlee and Mackenzie King share nuclear information with the U.N. and call for a United Nations Atomic Energy Commission.
 An offensive is begun in Manchuria by the Kuomintang (Chinese Nationalists) against further infiltration by the Chinese Communist Party.
 November 16
 Charles de Gaulle is unanimously elected president of France by the provisional government.
 The United States controversially imports 88 German scientists to help in the production of rocket technology.
 The foundation of UNESCO (United Nations Educational, Scientific and Cultural Organization) is agreed at a meeting in London.
 November 18 – The Tudeh party starts a bloodless coup, and will form Azerbaijan within days. Soviet troops prevent Iranian troops from getting involved.
 November 20 – The Nuremberg trials begin: Trials against 22 Nazis for war crimes of World War II start at the Palace of Justice, Nuremberg.
 November 26 – U.S. Ambassador to China Patrick J. Hurley resigns after he is unable to broker a deal between Chiang Kai-shek and Mao Tse-tung.
 November 28
 The 1945 Balochistan earthquake causes a tsunami and kills 4,000.
 British fascist John Amery pleads guilty to treason, and is condemned to death.
 November 29
 The Socialist Federal Republic of Yugoslavia is declared (this day is celebrated as Republic Day until the 1990s). Marshal Tito is named president.
 Assembly of the world's first general purpose electronic computer, the Electronic Numerical Integrator Analyzer and Computer (ENIAC), is completed in the United States, covering  of floor space, and the first set of calculations is run on it.

December 

 December 2
 General Eurico Gaspar Dutra is elected president of Brazil.
 French banks (Banque de France, BNCI, CNEP, Crédit Lyonnais, and Société Générale) are nationalized.
 December 3 – Communist demonstrations in Athens presage the Greek Civil War.
 December 4 – The United States Senate approves the entry of the United States into the United Nations by a vote of 65–7.
 December 5 – Flight 19 of United States Navy Grumman TBF Avenger torpedo bombers disappears on a training exercise from Naval Air Station Fort Lauderdale.
 December 9 – American General George S. Patton is involved in a car accident in Germany, resulting in his death on December 21.
 December 27 – Twenty-one nations ratify the articles creating the World Bank.

Date unknown
 A team at Oak Ridge National Laboratory (led by Charles Coryell) discovers chemical element 61, the only one still missing between 1 and 96 on the periodic table, which they will name promethium. Found by analysis of fission products of irradiated uranium fuel, its discovery is not made public until 1947.
 The first geothermal milk pasteurization is done in Klamath Falls, Oregon, United States.

Births

January
 January 1
 Pietro Grasso, Italian politician
 Jacky Ickx, Belgian racing driver
 January 3 – Stephen Stills, American rock singer-songwriter (Crosby, Stills, Nash & Young)
 January 4
 Sima Bina, Iranian vocalist
 Richard R. Schrock, American chemist, Nobel Prize laureate
 January 5
 Lynn Di Nino, American artist
 Júlio Isidro, Portuguese television presenter
 Robert Pindyck, American economist
 January 7 – Shulamith Firestone, Canadian American feminist, writer (d. 2012)
 January 10 – Sir Rod Stewart, British rock singer
 January 12 – André Bicaba, Burkinabé sprinter
 January 14 – Einar Hákonarson, Icelandic painter
 January 15
 Vince Foster, American deputy White House counsel during the first term of President Bill Clinton (d. 1993)
 Princess Michael of Kent, German-born member of the British Royal Family
 January 17 – Javed Akhtar, Indian political activist, poet, lyricist and screenwriter
 January 20 – Robert Olen Butler, American writer
 January 21
 Arthur Beetson, Australian rugby league player and coach (d. 2011)
 Martin Shaw, British actor
 January 24 – Subhash Ghai, Indian film director, producer and screenwriter
 January 25 – Leigh Taylor-Young, American actress
 January 26
 Jacqueline du Pré, English cellist (d. 1987)
 Graham Williams, New Zealand rugby union player (d. 2018)
 January 27 – Harold Cardinal, Cree political leader, writer and lawyer (d. 2005)
 January 28
 Karen Lynn Gorney, American actress (Saturday Night Fever)
 Chuck Pyle, American country-folk singer-songwriter (d. 2015)
 January 29
 Jim Nicholson, Northern Irish politician
 Tom Selleck, American actor (Magnum, P.I.)
 January 31 – Joseph Kosuth, American artist

February
 February 1 – Yasuhiro Takai, Japanese professional baseball player (d. 2019)
 February 3
 Bob Griese, American football player
 Philip Waruinge, Kenyan boxer
 February 4
 John P. Jumper, Retired United States Air Force general
 February 5 – Sarah Weddington, American attorney (d. 2021)
 February 6 – Bob Marley, Jamaican reggae singer-songwriter and musician (d. 1981)
 February 7 – Gerald Davies, Welsh rugby player
 February 9 
 Mia Farrow, American actress
 Yoshinori Ohsumi, Japanese cell biologist 
 February 10 – Koo Bon-moo, South Korean business executive (d. 2018)
 February 12
 Luiz Carlos Alborghetti, Italian-Brazilian radio commenter, showman and political figure (d. 2009)
 Maud Adams, Swedish actress
 David D. Friedman, American economist
 February 13 – Simon Schama, English historian
 February 14
 Adiss Harmandian, Lebanese-Armenian pop singer (d. 2019)
 Prince Hans-Adam II of Liechtenstein
 February 15 – Douglas Hofstadter, American cognitive scientist
 February 16
 Pete Christlieb, American jazz musician
 Elliot Mintz, American consultant
 February 17 – Brenda Fricker, Irish actress
 February 18 – Hashem Mahameed, Israeli politician (d. 2018)
 February 22 – Oliver, American singer (Good Morning Starshine) (d. 2000)
 February 24 – Barry Bostwick, American actor
 February 25 – Roy Saari, American swimmer (d. 2008)
 February 26 – Marta Kristen, Norwegian actress (Lost In Space)
 February 27 – Carl Anderson, American singer, actor (Jesus Christ Superstar) (d. 2004)
 February 28 – Bubba Smith, American football player and actor (d. 2011)

March
 March 1 – Dirk Benedict, American actor
 March 3 – George Miller, Australian film director
 March 4
 Dieter Meier, Swiss singer, writer
 Tommy Svensson, Swedish football manager, player
 March 7 – Arthur Lee, American musician (d. 2006)
 March 8
 Micky Dolenz, American actor, director and rock musician (The Monkees)
 Anselm Kiefer, German painter
 March 9
 Katja Ebstein, German singer
 Dennis Rader, American serial killer
 March 10 – Nobuhiko Higashikuni, Japanese Imperial prince (d. 2019)
 March 13
 Othman Abdullah, Malaysian footballer (d. 2015)
 Anatoly Fomenko, Russian mathematician
 March 14 – Michael Martin Murphey, American country singer-songwriter
 March 17 
 Hassan Bechara, Lebanese wrestler (d.1945)
 Katri Helena, Finnish singer
 March 18
 Michael Reagan, American television personality, political commentator and Republican strategist
 Marta Suplicy, Brazilian politician and psychologist
 March 20
 Jay Ingram, Canadian television host, author and journalist
 Bobby Jameson, American singer-songwriter (d. 2015)
 Pat Riley, American basketball coach
 March 21 – Charles Greene, American Olympic athlete (d. 2022)
 March 26 – Mikhail Voronin, Russian gymnast (d. 2004)
 March 27 – Władysław Stachurski, Polish football player, manager (d. 2013)
 March 28
 Rodrigo Duterte, 16th President of the Philippines
 Raine Loo, Estonian actress
 March 29
 Walt Frazier, African-American basketball player
 Willem Ruis, Dutch game show host (d. 1986)
 March 30 – Eric Clapton, English rock guitarist  
 March 31
 Nana Ampadu, Ghanaian musician (d. 2021)
 Edwin Catmull, American computer scientist, President of Walt Disney Animation Studios

April 
 April 2
 Jürgen Drews, German singer
 Linda Hunt, American actress
 April 4 – Daniel Cohn-Bendit, French political activist
 April 5
 Cem Karaca, Turkish musician (d. 2004)
 Tommy Smith, English footballer (d. 2019)
 April 11 – Christian Quadflieg, German actor
 April 12 – Lee Jong-wook, South Korean Director-General of the World Health Organization (d. 2006)
 April 13
 Lucha Corpi, Mexican poet
 Tony Dow, American actor, producer and director (d. 2022)
 Lowell George, American rock musician (Little Feat) (d. 1979)
 April 14
 Ritchie Blackmore, English rock guitarist
 Tuilaʻepa Saʻilele Malielegaoi, Prime Minister of Samoa
 April 20 – Naftali Temu, Kenyan Olympic long-distance runner (d. 2003)
 April 21 – Ana Lúcia Torre, Brazilian actress
 April 24 – Larry Tesler, American computer scientist (cut, copy, paste) (d. 2020)
 April 25 – Björn Ulvaeus, Swedish rock songwriter (ABBA)
 April 29 – Tammi Terrell, African-American soul singer (d. 1970)
 April 30 – Lara Saint Paul, Eritrean-born Italian singer (d. 2018)

May
 May 1 – Rita Coolidge, American pop singer
 May 3 – Jeffrey C. Hall, American geneticist and chronobiologist, Nobel Prize laureate
 May 4
 David Magson, mathematician and businessman
 Narasimhan Ram, Indian journalist
 May 6 – Bob Seger, American rock singer
 May 7 – Robin Strasser, American actress
 May 8 – Keith Jarrett, American musician
 May 9 – Jupp Heynckes, German footballer and manager
 May 13 – Tammam Salam, 34th Prime Minister of Lebanon
 May 14 – Yochanan Vollach, Israeli footballer and president of Maccabi Haifa, CEO
 May 15 – Duarte Pio, Duke of Braganza, heir to the Portuguese crown
 May 17 – Tony Roche, Australian tennis player
 May 19 – Pete Townshend, English rock guitarist, lyricist (The Who)
 May 20 – Anton Zeilinger, Austrian quantum physicist, Nobel Prize laureate
 May 21
 Richard Hatch, American actor (Battlestar Galactica) (d. 2017)
 Ernst Messerschmid, German physicist, astronaut
 May 22 – Victoria Wyndham, American actress (Another World)
 May 23
 Lauren Chapin, American child actress, evangelist
 Doris Mae Oulton, Canadian community developer
 May 24 – Priscilla Presley, American actress, businesswoman
 May 28
 Patch Adams, American physician, comedian, social activist, clown and author
 John Fogerty, American rock singer (Creedence Clearwater Revival)
 May 29
 Gary Brooker, English rock keyboardist and singer-songwriter (Procol Harum) (d. 2022)
 Jean-Pierre Van Rossem, Belgian businessman, fraudster and politician (d. 2018)
 May 30
 Andrea Bronfman, American philanthropist (d. 2006)
 Gladys Horton, American singer (The Marvelettes) (d. 2011)
 May 31
 Rainer Werner Fassbinder, German film director (d. 1982)
 Laurent Gbagbo, President of Côte d'Ivoire

June
 June 1 – Frederica von Stade, American mezzo-soprano
 June 2 – Jon Peters, American film producer
 June 3 – Hale Irwin, American professional golfer
 June 4 – Anthony Braxton, American composer and musical instrumentalist
 June 5
 John Carlos, American athlete
 Théophile Georges Kassab, Catholic prelate (d. 2013)
 Nechama Rivlin, Israeli socialite, 10th First lady of Israel (d. 2019)
 June 6 – David Dukes, American actor (d. 2000)
 June 7 – Wolfgang Schüssel, Chancellor of Austria
 June 9 – Nike Wagner, German woman of the theater
 June 10 – Benny Gallagher, Scottish singer-songwriter and multi-instrumentalist, half of duo Gallagher and Lyle
 June 11 – Adrienne Barbeau, American actress, television personality and author (Maude)
 June 12 – Pat Jennings, Northern Irish footballer
 June 14 – Jörg Immendorff, German painter
 June 15
 Françoise Chandernagor, French writer
 Miriam Defensor Santiago, Filipino politician (b. 2016)
 June 16
 Claire Alexander, Canadian ice hockey player
 Ivan Lins, Latin Grammy-winning Brazilian musician
 June 17
 P. D. T. Acharya, Secretary General, Indian Lok Sabha
 Art Bell, American radio talk show host (Coast to Coast AM) (d. 2018)
 Ken Livingstone, British politician
 Eddy Merckx, Belgian cyclist
 June 19
 Radovan Karadžić, Serbian politician
 Aung San Suu Kyi, Myanmar politician and poet, Nobel Peace Prize recipient
 June 20 – Anne Murray, Canadian singer 
 June 21
 Roberto D'Angelo, Italian slalom canoeist
 Luis Castañeda Lossio, Peruvian politician
 Thiagarajan, Indian actor, director and producer
 Nirmalendu Goon, Bangladeshi poet
 Marijana Lubej, Slovenian sprinter
 June 22
 Juma Kapuya, Tanzanian politician
 Dieter Versen, German football defender
 June 23
 Ana Chumachenco, Italian violinist
 Kim Småge, Norwegian novelist, crime fiction writer, writer of short stories and children's writer
 June 24
 George Pataki, Governor of New York
 Betty Stöve, Dutch tennis player
 Ali Akbar Velayati, Iranian physician, politician
 June 25
 Baba Gana Kingibe, Nigerian politician
 Mohammed Bakar, Malaysian footballer
 Chaiyasit Shinawatra, commander-in-chief of the Royal Thai Army
 Carolyn Cheeks Kilpatrick, American politician
 Guillermo Mendoza, Mexican cyclist
 Lali Armengol, Spanish playwright, professor and theater director
 June 26 – Paul Chun, Hong Kong actor
 June 27
 Ami Ayalon, Israeli politician
 Catherine Lacoste, French amateur golfer
 Lu Sheng-yen, Taiwanese leader of the True Buddha School
 Norma Kamali, American fashion designer
 Jose Miguel Arroyo, First Gentleman of the Philippines
 June 28 – Raul Seixas, Brazilian rock singer (d. 1989)
 June 29 – Chandrika Kumaratunga, 5th President of Sri Lanka
 June 30
 Kevin Jackman, Australian rules footballer
 Jerry Kenney, American Major League Baseball infielder
 Sean Scully, Irish-American-based painter, printmaker
 James Snyder Jr., American author, attorney and politician

July
 July 1
 Jane Cederqvist, Swedish freestyle swimmer
 Visu, Indian writer, director, stage, actor and talk-show host (d. 2020)
 Billy Rohr, American Major League Baseball player
 Debbie Harry, American rock singer (Blondie)
 July 2 – Linda Warren, American author
 July 3 – Thomas Mapfumo, Zimbabwean musician
 July 4
 Tiong Thai King, Malaysian politician
 Steinar Amundsen, Norwegian sprint canoeist
 July 5
 Nurul Islam Nahid, Bangladeshi politician
 Miroslav Mišković, Serbian business magnate, investor
 July 6 – Burt Ward, American actor (Batman)
 July 7
 Heloísa Pinheiro, Brazilian model, businesswoman
 Moncef Marzouki, Tunisian politician; 4th President of Tunisia
 Li Chi-an, North Korean football striker
 Matti Salminen, Finnish bass singer
 July 8 – Micheline Calmy-Rey, Swiss Federal Councilor
 July 9
 Dean Koontz, American writer
 Mohammad Reza Nematzadeh, Iranian politician, engineer
 July 10
 Zlatko Tomčić, Croatian politician
 Daniel Ona Ondo, Gabonese politician
 Virginia Wade, English professional tennis player
 Ron Glass, African-American actor (d. 2016)
 July 11 – Richard Wesley, American playwright, screenwriter
 July 12
 Leopoldo Mastelloni, Italian actor, comedian and singer
 Thor Martinsen, Norwegian ice hockey player
 July 13
 Robert H. Foglesong, U.S. general
 Danny Abramowicz, American football player, coach
 July 14 – Antun Vujić, Croatian politician, philosopher, political analyst, lexicographer and author
 July 15
 Hong Ra-hee, South Korean billionaire businesswoman, philanthropist
 Jürgen Möllemann, German politician (d. 2003)
 Jan-Michael Vincent, American actor (d. 2019)
 July 16
 Victor Sloan, Irish artist
 Çetin Tekindor, Turkish actor
 Roy Ho Ten Soeng, Dutch politician
 Jos Stelling, Dutch film director, screenwriter
 July 17
 Eduardo Olivera, Mexican modern pentathlete
 Kim Won-hong, North Korean politician, military leader
 Alexander, Crown Prince of Yugoslavia
 July 19
 Oleg Fotin, Russian swimmer
 Richard Henderson, Scottish molecular biologist, Nobel Prize laureate
 Uri Rosenthal, Dutch politician
 July 20
 Kim Carnes, American singer-songwriter (Bette Davis Eyes)
 Lothar Koepsel, German sailor
 Simbarashe Mumbengegwi, Zimbabwean politician and diplomat
 July 21
 John Lowe, English darts player
 Barry Richards, South African batsman
 July 24 – Azim Premji, Indian businessman
 July 26
 Betty Davis, American funk and soul singer
 Helen Mirren, British actress
 July 28 – Jim Davis, American cartoonist (Garfield)
 July 30
 Patrick Modiano, French novelist, Nobel Prize laureate
 David Sanborn, American saxophonist

August
 August 1 – Douglas D. Osheroff, American physicist, Nobel Prize laureate
 August 4 – Alan Mulally, American businessman, CEO of the Ford Motor Company
 August 5 – Loni Anderson, American actress (WKRP in Cincinnati)
 August 9 – Posy Simmonds, English cartoonist
 August 12 
Ron Mael, American musician (Sparks)
J. D. McClatchy, American poet and literary critic (d. 2018)
 August 14
 Steve Martin, American actor and comedian  
 Valeriy Shmarov, Ukrainian politician (d. 2018)
 Eliana Pittman, Brazilian singer, actress
 Wim Wenders, German film director, producer
 August 15
 Bobby Treviño, Mexican baseball player (d. 2018)
 Miyuki Matsuhisa, Japanese artistic gymnast
 Khaleda Zia, Bangladesh politician, Prime Minister of Bangladesh
 August 19 – Ian Gillan, English rock singer (Deep Purple)
 August 22
 David Chase, American writer, director and television producer
 Ron Dante, American rock singer-songwriter and record producer (The Archies)
August 24 – Vincent K. "Vince" McMahon, American professional wrestling promoter, chairman and CEO of WWE
 August 25 – Daniel Hulet, Belgian cartoonist (d. 2011)
 August 26 – Tom Ridge, American politician
 August 27 – Marianne Sägebrecht, German film actress
 August 29
 Alyosha Abrahamyan, Armenian football player (d. 2018)
 Wyomia Tyus, American Olympic athlete
 August 31
 Sir Van Morrison, Irish rock musician  
 Itzhak Perlman, Israeli-born American violinist, conductor

September
 September 1 – Mustafa Balel, Turkish writer
 September 5
 K. N. T. Sastry, Indian film critic, director and writer (d. 2018)
 Al Stewart, Scottish singer-songwriter (Year of the Cat)
 September 6 – Victor Ramahatra, 5th Prime Minister of Madagascar
 September 7 – Jacques Lemaire, Canadian ice hockey coach
 September 8
 Ron "Pigpen" McKernan, American musician (Grateful Dead) (d. 1973)
 Rogatien Vachon, Canadian ice hockey player
 September 10 – José Feliciano, Puerto Rican-American singer ("Feliz Navidad")
 September 11 – Franz Beckenbauer, German footballer, coach
 September 12 – Richard Thaler, American economist
 September 14 – Benjamin Harjo Jr., Native American artist
 September 15 – Jessye Norman, American soprano (d. 2019)
 September 16 – Pat Stevens, American voice actress (d. 2010)
 September 17
 Phil Jackson, American basketball coach
 Bruce Spence, Australian actor
 September 18 
 John McAfee, British-American computer programmer and businessman (d. 2021)
 P. F. Sloan, American singer-songwriter (d. 2015)
 September 21
 Shaw Clifton, Northern Ireland-born General of the Salvation Army
 Kay Ryan, American poet
 September 22 – Gonzaguinha, Brazilian singer, composer (d. 1991)
 September 24 – John Rutter, English choral composer, conductor
 September 26 – Bryan Ferry, English singer-songwriter and musician (Roxy Music)
 September 27 – Jack Goldstein, Canadian artist (d. 2003)
 September 29 – Nadezhda Chizhova, Russian athlete
 September 30
 Ehud Olmert, 12th Prime Minister of Israel
 Ralph Siegel, German record producer, songwriter

October
 October 1
 Rod Carew, Panamanian-American baseball player
 Donny Hathaway, African-American soul singer-songwriter (d. 1979)
 Ram Nath Kovind, 14th President of India
 October 2 
 Regina Torné, Mexican actress, singer and television presenter
 Don McLean, American singer-songwriter ("American Pie")
 October 3 – Viktor Saneyev, Soviet athlete and Olympic champion (d. 2022)
 October 6 – Ivan Graziani, Italian singer-songwriter (d. 1997)
 October 9
 Vijaya Kumaratunga, Sri Lankan actor and politician (d. 1988)
 Archbishop Nikon of Boston, Albanian bishop (d. 2019)
 October 12
 Aurore Clément, French actress
 Dusty Rhodes, American wrestler (d. 2015)
 October 18
 Norio Wakamoto, Japanese voice actor
 Yıldo, Turkish showman, footballer
 October 19
 Angus Deaton, Scottish-born economist, recipient of the Nobel Memorial Prize in Economic Sciences
 John Lithgow, American actor (Third Rock from the Sun)
 October 22 – Yvan Ponton, Canadian actor, sportscaster
 October 23 – Kim Larsen, Danish rock musician (d. 2018)
 October 24
 Eugenie Scott, American Executive Director of the National Center for Science Education
 Sean Solomon, American Principal Investigator of NASA's MESSENGER mission to Mercury and director of the Department of Terrestrial Magnetism at the Carnegie Institution for Science
 October 25
 Peter Ledger, Australian artist (d. 1994)
 David Schramm, American astrophysicist and educator (d. 1997)
 Keaton Yamada, Japanese voice actor
 October 26
 Pat Conroy, American author (d. 2016)
 Jaclyn Smith, American actress, businesswoman (Charlie's Angels)
 October 27
 Luiz Inácio Lula da Silva, 35th President of Brazil
 Carrie Snodgress, American actress (d. 2004)
 October 29
 Ching Li, Taiwanese actress (d. 2017)
 Melba Moore, African-American singer, actress 
 October 30 – Henry Winkler, American actor, producer and director (Happy Days)

November
 November 3 – Gerd Müller, German footballer (d. 2021)
 November 5 – Jacques Lanctôt, Canadian terrorist
 November 7
 Bob Englehart, American editorial cartoonist
 Waljinah, Javanese singer
 November 9 – Charlie Robinson, African-American actor (d. 2021)
 November 10 – Madeleine Juneau, Canadian museologist
 November 11 – Daniel Ortega, 58th and 62nd President of Nicaragua
 November 12 – Neil Young, Canadian singer-songwriter, musician  
 November 15 – Anni-Frid Lyngstad, Norwegian-born rock singer (ABBA)
 November 17
 Elvin Hayes, American basketball player
 Abdelmadjid Tebboune, President of Algeria
 November 18
 Wilma Mankiller, Chief of the Cherokee Nation (d. 2010)
 Mahinda Rajapaksa, Sri Lankan politician, 6th President of Sri Lanka
 November 21 – Goldie Hawn, American actress
 Kalervo Kummola – Finnish ice hockey executive, businessman, and politician
 November 22 – Kari Tapio, Finnish singer (d. 2010)
 November 23 – Dennis Nilsen, Scottish serial killer (d. 2018)
 November 24 – Nuruddin Farah, Somali novelist
 November 25 – Mary Jo Deschanel, American actress
 November 26 – John McVie, English rock musician (Fleetwood Mac)
 November 27
 Barbara Anderson, American actress
 James Avery, African-American actor (d. 2013)
 November 30
 Roger Glover, English rock musician (Deep Purple)
 Radu Lupu, Romanian classical pianist (d. 2022)

December
 December 1 – Bette Midler, American actress, comedian and singer 
 December 2 – Tex Watson, American multiple murderer, 'Manson Family' member
 December 3 – Bozhidar Dimitrov, Bulgarian historian, politician and polemicist (d. 2018)
 December 4 – Geoff Emerick, English recording engineer (d. 2018)
 December 7 – Clive Russell, English actor
 December 8 – Julie Heldman, American tennis player
 December 11 – Sharafuddin of Selangor, Sultan of Selangor
 December 12
 René Pétillon, French satirical, political cartoonist (d. 2018)
 Portia Simpson-Miller, 2-time Prime Minister of Jamaica
 Kathy Garver, American actress, author and online radio hostess
 Donald Pandiangan, Indonesian archery athlete (d. 2008)
 Heather North, American actress (d. 2017)
 December 15
 Michael King, New Zealand popular historian, author and biographer (d. 2004)
 Thaao Penghlis, Australian actor
 December 16 – Patti Deutsch, American voice actress (d. 2017)
 December 17 – Ernie Hudson, African-American actor
 December 18 – Carolyn Wood, American professional swimmer
 December 19 – Elaine Joyce, American actress, game show panelist
 December 20
 Peter Criss, American rock drummer (KISS)
 Sivakant Tiwari, senior legal officer of the Singapore Legal Service (d. 2010)
 December 21 – Mari Lill, Estonian actress
 December 22 – Diane Sawyer, American news journalist
 December 23 – Donald A. Ritchie, American historian
 December 24
 Lemmy, British singer, bassist (Motörhead) (d. 2015)
 Nicholas Meyer, American screenwriter, producer, director and novelist
 Sharafuddin of Selangor, Sultan of Selangor
 Steve Smith, Canadian actor, comedian and writer
 December 25 – Noel Redding, English musician (d. 2003)
 December 30 – Davy Jones, English-born pop singer, actor (The Monkees) (d. 2012)
 December 31
 Barbara Carrera, Nicaraguan-American actress
 Vernon Wells, Australian actor
 Connie Willis, American fiction writer

Deaths

January
 January 2 – Sir Bertram Ramsay, British admiral (b. 1883)
 January 3 – Edgar Cayce, American mystic (b. 1877)
 January 4 – Ricardo Jiménez Oreamuno, 3-time President of Costa Rica (b. 1859)
 January 6
 Josefa Llanes Escoda, Filipino women's suffrage advocate, founder of the Girl Scouts of the Philippines (b. 1898)
 Vladimir Vernadsky, Soviet mineralogist, geochemist (b. 1863)
 January 7
 Alexander Stirling Calder, American sculptor (b. 1870)
 Thomas McGuire, American World War II fighter ace (killed in action) (b. 1920)
 Prince Rainer of Saxe-Coburg and Gotha (killed in action) (b. 1900)
 January 9 – Jüri Uluots, Estonian statesman (b. 1890)
 January 10 – Pēteris Juraševskis, 8th Prime Minister of Latvia (b. 1872)
 January 12 – Teresio Olivelli, Italian Roman Catholic soldier and venerable (b. 1916)
 January 15 – Pedro Abad Santos, Filipino politician, brother of José Abad Santos (b. 1876)
 January 16 – José Fabella, Filipino physician (b. 1889)
 January 19
 Petar Bojović, Serbian field marshal (b. 1858)
 Gustave Mesny, French Army general (b. 1886)
 January 20 – Federico Pedrocchi, Italian artist, writer (killed on active service) (b. 1907)
 January 21 – Sir Archibald Murray, British Army general (b. 1860)
 January 22 – Else Lasker-Schüler, German poet, author (b. 1869)
 January 23
 Eugen Bolz, German politician, 20 July Plotter (executed) (b. 1881)
 Nikolaus Gross, German Roman Catholic layman, martyr and blessed (b. 1898)
 Newton E. Mason, United States Navy rear admiral (b. 1850)
 January 30
 Sir William Goodenough, British admiral (b. 1867)
 Pedro Paulet, Peruvian scientist (b. 1874)
 January 31 – Eddie Slovik, American soldier (executed for desertion) (b. 1920)

February
 February (or March) – Anne Frank, German-born Jewish diarist, writer (typhus in Bergen-Belsen concentration camp) (b. 1929)
 February 1
 Ivan Bagryanov, 30th Prime Minister of Bulgaria (executed) (b. 1891)
 Teresa Bogusławska, Polish poet and resistance worker (meningitis) (b. 1929)
 Dobri Bozhilov, 29th Prime Minister of Bulgaria (executed) (b. 1884)
 Bogdan Filov, Bulgarian archaeologist, historian and politician, 28th Prime Minister of Bulgaria (executed) (b. 1883)
 Petar Gabrovski, former acting Prime Minister of Bulgaria (executed) (b. 1898)
 Johan Huizinga, Dutch cultural historian (b. 1872)
 Prince Kiril of Bulgaria (executed) (b. 1895)
 February 2
 Adolf Brand, German campaigner for homosexuality (air raid victim) (b. 1874)
 Alfred Delp, German Jesuit priest and philosopher of the German Resistance, 20 July plotter (executed) (b. 1907)
 Carl Friedrich Goerdeler, German politician, civil servant, executive and economist, 20 July plotter (executed) (b. 1884)
 Gustav Heistermann von Ziehlberg, German general, 20 July plotter (executed) (b. 1898)
 Joe Hunt, American tennis champion (military aircraft crash) (b. 1919)
 February 3 – Roland Freisler, Nazi German judge (air raid victim) (b. 1893)
 February 5
 Denise Bloch, French World War II heroine (executed) (b. 1915)
 Aurelio Craffonara, Italian painter, illustrator (b. 1875)
 Lilian Rolfe, French World War II heroine (executed) (b. 1914)
 Violette Szabo, French/British World War II heroine (executed) (b. 1921)
 February 6 – Robert Brasillach, French writer (executed) (b. 1909)
 February 7 – Karl Schwitalle, German Olympic weightlifter (killed in action) (b. 1906)
 February 8 – Robert Mallet-Stevens, French architect, designer (b. 1886)
 February 10 – Anacleto Díaz, Filipino jurist (murdered during the Battle of Manila) (b. 1878)
 February 11 – Al Dubin, Swiss-born American songwriter (b. 1891)
 February 12 – Antonio Villa-Real, Filipino jurist (murdered during the Battle of Manila) (b. 1878)
 February 13 – Maria Orosa, Filipino technologist, chemist, humanitarian and WWII heroine (air raid victim) (b. 1893)
 February 15 – Helmut Möckel, German youth leader, politician (automobile accident) (b. 1909)
 February 17 – Gabrielle Weidner, Belgian World War II heroine (b. 1914)
 February 18 – Ivan Chernyakhovsky, Soviet general (died of wounds) (b. 1906)
 February 19
 John Basilone, American war hero (killed in action) (b. 1916)
 Heinrich Jasper, German politician (b. 1875)
 February 21 – Eric Liddell, British Olympic athlete (in internment camp) (b. 1902)
 February 22 – Sara Josephine Baker, American physician (b. 1873)
 February 23
 Serafino Mazzolini, Italian politician, lawyer and journalist (b. 1890)
 José María Moncada, 19th President of Nicaragua (b. 1870)
 Aleksei Nikolaevich Tolstoy, Russian writer (b. 1883)
 February 24 – Josef Mayr-Nusser, Italian Roman Catholic layman, martyr and blessed (b. 1910)
 February 25 – Mário de Andrade, Brazilian writer, photographer (b. 1893)

March
 March 1
 Fritz Goerdeler, German resistance member (executed) (b. 1886)
 Lothar Sieber, German test pilot (killed in aviation accident) (b. 1922)
 March 2 – Emily Carr, Canadian painter (b. 1871)
 March 3
 Gheorghe Avramescu, Romanian general (in custody) (b. 1884)
 Aleksandra Samusenko, Soviet WWII tank commander (died of wounds) (b. 1922)
 March 4
 Charles W. Bryan, American politician (b. 1867)
 Lucille La Verne, American actress (b. 1872)
 Mark Sandrich, American film director (b. 1900)
 March 5
 Rupert Downes, Australian general (killed in military aircraft accident) (b. 1885)
 Albert Richards, British war artist (killed in action) (b. 1919)
 George Vasey, Australian general (killed in military aircraft accident) (b. 1895)
 Hasso von Boehmer, German lieutenant colonel, July 20 plotter (executed) (b. 1904)
 March 7 – Ralph Ignatowski, American WWII hero (killed in action) (b. 1926)
 March 8 – Sadasue Senda, Imperial Japanese Army lieutenant general, battle of iwo jima  (killed in action) (b. 1892)
 March 12 – Friedrich Fromm, German Nazi official (executed) (b. 1888)
 March 14
Antônio Francisco Braga, Brazilian composer (b. 1868)
Mary Helen Young, Scottish nurse and resistance fighter during World War II (born 1883)
 March 15 – Sava Caracaș, Romanian general (b. 1890)
 March 18 – William Grover-Williams, British/French racing driver, war hero (executed) (b. 1903)
 March 19 – Marcel Callo, French Roman Catholic layman, martyr and blessed (in concentration camp) (b. 1921)
 March 20
 Dorothy Campbell, Scottish golfer (b. 1883)
 Lord Alfred Douglas, English poet (b. 1870)
 Maria Lacerda de Moura, Brazilian feminist, anarchist, teacher, journalist and teacher (b. 1887)
 March 22
 Eliyahu Bet-Zuri, Israeli assassin (executed) (b. 1922)
 Eliyahu Hakim, Israeli assassin (executed) (b. 1925)
 Enrico Caviglia, Italian marshal (b. 1862)
 Branca de Gonta Colaço, Portuguese writer, scholar and linguist (b. 1880)
 Heinrich Maier, Austrian Roman Catholic priest and blessed (b. 1908)
 Takeichi Nishi, Japanese equestrian gold medalist (1932), tank commander at Battle of Iwo Jima (killed in action) (b. 1902)
 March 23 – Élisabeth de Rothschild, French WWII heroine (b. 1902)
 March 26
 David Lloyd George, British politician and statesman, 51st Prime Minister of the United Kingdom (b. 1863)
 Ichimaru Toshinosuke, Japanese naval aviator, commander at Battle of Iwo Jima (b. 1891)
 Tadamichi Kuribayashi, Imperial Japanese Army general, commander of the battle of Iwo Jima (probably killed in action) (b. 1891)
 Boris Shaposhnikov, Soviet military leader, Marshal of the Soviet Union (b. 1882)
 March 27 – Halid Ziya Uşaklıgil, Turkish author (b. 1867)
 March 29 – Ferenc Csik, Hungarian swimmer (air raid victim) (b. 1913)
 March 30
 Élise Rivet, French nun, war heroine (murdered in concentration camp) (b. 1890)
 Maurice Rose, American general (killed in action) (b. 1899)
 March 31
 Hans Fischer, German chemist, Nobel Prize laureate (suicide) (b. 1881)
 Harriet Boyd Hawes, American archaeologist (b. 1871)
 Torgny Segerstedt, Swedish newspaper editor, publicist (b. 1876)
 Maria Skobtsova, Soviet Orthodox nun and saint (killed by poison) (b. 1891)
 Natalia Tulasiewicz, Polish teacher and Roman Catholic blessed (murdered in concentration camp) (b. 1906)

April
 April 7
 Seiichi Itō, Japanese admiral (lost in action) (b. 1890)
 Aruga Kōsaku, Japanese admiral (lost in action) (b. 1897)
 April 9
 Dietrich Bonhoeffer, German theologian (executed) (b. 1906)
 Wilhelm Canaris, German admiral, head of the Abwehr (executed) (b. 1887)
 Hans von Dohnanyi, Hungarian-born German lawyer, member of the German Resistance, 20 July Plotter (executed) (b. 1902)
 April 10 
 Gloria Dickson, American actress (fire victim) (b. 1917)
 Hendrik Nicolaas Werkman, Dutch artist and printer (b. 1882)
 April 11 – Frederick Lugard, 1st Baron Lugard, British colonial administrator (b. 1858)
 April 12 – Franklin D. Roosevelt, American political leader and statesman, 32nd President of the United States (b. 1882)
 April 13 – Ernst Cassirer, German philosopher (b. 1874)
 April 15 – Joachim Albrecht Eggeling, German SS general (suicide) (b. 1884)
 April 18
 Sir Ambrose Fleming, British electrical engineer and physicist (b. 1849)
 Ernie Pyle, American journalist (killed in action) (b. 1900)
 William, Prince of Albania (b. 1876)
 April 21 – Walter Model, German field marshal (suicide) (b. 1891)
 April 22 – Käthe Kollwitz, German artist (b. 1867)
 April 23 – Klaus Bonhoeffer, German resistance fighter, 20 July Plotter (executed) (b. 1901)
 April 24 – Ernst-Robert Grawitz, German SS Reichsphysician (suicide) (b. 1899)
 April 28
 Executed:
 Hermann Fegelein, German SS general (b. 1906)
 Benito Mussolini, Italian politician, journalist, 27th Prime Minister of Italy and Duce of Fascism (b. 1883)
 Clara Petacci, mistress of Benito Mussolini (b. 1912)
 Nicola Bombacci, Italian Fascist politician (b. 1879)
 Roberto Farinacci, Italian Fascist politician (b. 1892)
 Alessandro Pavolini, Italian Fascist politician (b. 1903)
 April 29 – Achille Starace, Italian Fascist politician (executed) (b. 1889) 
 April 30
 Luisa Ferida, Italian actress (executed) (b. 1914)
 Adolf Hitler, Austrian-born German politician, Führer of Germany (suicide) (b. 1889)
 Eva Braun, wife of Adolf Hitler (suicide) (b. 1912)

May
 May 1
 Joseph Goebbels, Chancellor of Germany for 1 day and Reich Minister of Propaganda (suicide) (b. 1897)
 Magda Goebbels, wife of Joseph Goebbels (suicide) (b. 1901)
 May 2
 Martin Bormann, Nazi Party leader and private secretary to Adolf Hitler (presumed suicide) (b. 1900)
 Wilhelm Burgdorf, German general (suicide) (b. 1895)
 Hans Krebs, German general (suicide) (b. 1898)
 Prince Waldemar of Prussia (haemophilia) (b. 1889)
 May 3 – Mario Blasich, Italian physician, politician (b. 1878)
 May 4 – Fedor von Bock, German field marshal (b. 1880)
 May 6 – Xhem Hasa, Albanian nationalist (b. 1908)
 May 7 – Vladimir Boyarsky, Soviet army officer (b. 1901)
 May 8
 Francis Bruguière, American photographer (b. 1875)
 Julius Hirsch, German footballer (killed in Auschwitz concentration camp) (b. 1892)
 Wilhelm Rediess, SS and Police Leader of Nazi-occupied Norway (suicide) (b. 1900)
 Bernhard Rust, education minister of Nazi Germany (presumed suicide) (b. 1883)
 Josef Terboven, Reichskommissar of Nazi-occupied Norway (suicide) (b. 1898)
 May 9 – Gustav Becking, German musicologist (b. 1894)
 May 10 – Konrad Henlein, Sudeten German Nazi leader (suicide) (b. 1898)
 May 11 – Kiyoshi Ogawa, Japanese kamikaze pilot (b. 1922)
 May 14
 Joseph Barthélemy, French jurist, politician and journalist (b. 1874)
 Heber J. Grant, 7th President of the Church of Jesus Christ of Latter-day Saints (b. 1856)
 May 15 
 Kenneth J. Alford, British soldier and composer (b. 1881)
 Charles Williams, British author (b. 1886)
 May 16
Shintarō Hashimoto, Japanese admiral (killed in action) (b. 1892)
Kaju Sugiura, Japanese admiral (killed in action) (b. 1896)
 May 18 – William Joseph Simmons, American founder of the second Ku Klux Klan (b. 1880)
 May 19 – Philipp Bouhler, German Nazi leader and general (suicide) (b. 1899)
 May 21 – Prince Kan'in Kotohito, Japanese prince, member of the Imperial Japanese Army General Staff Office (b. 1865)
 May 23 – Heinrich Himmler, German politician, Reichsführer-SS (suicide) (b. 1900)
 May 24 – Robert Ritter von Greim, German field marshal (suicide) (b. 1892)
 May 25 
 Rafael Estrella Ureña, Dominican lawyer and politician, acting President of the Dominican Republic (b. 1889)
 Ishii Kikujirō, Japanese diplomat and politician (killed in bombing raid) (b. 1866)
 May 31
 Odilo Globocnik, Austrian Nazi leader (suicide)  (b. 1904)
 Curt von Gottberg, German SS general (suicide) (b. 1896)

June
 June 4 – Georg Kaiser, German dramatist (b. 1878)
 June 7 – Kitaro Nishida, Japanese philosopher (b. 1870)
 June 8
 Robert Desnos, French poet, resistance fighter (typhoid) (b. 1900)
 Karl Hanke, German Nazi general and last Reichsführer-SS (killed) (b. 1903)
 June 11 – Lurana W. Sheldon, American author and editor (b. 1862)
 June 12 – Theodore Hardeen, Hungarian-born American  magician and stunt performer, founder of the Magician's Guild (b. 1876)
 June 13 – Minoru Ōta, Japanese admiral (suicide) (b. 1891)
 June 15
 Nikola Avramov, Bulgarian painter (b. 1897)
 Carl Gustaf Ekman, Prime Minister of Sweden (b. 1872)
 Amélie Rives Troubetzkoy, American author (b. 1863)
 Aris Velouchiotis, Greek World War II resistance leader (b. 1905)
 June 16
 Nikolai Berzarin, Soviet Red Army general (b. 1904)
 Nils Edén, 15th Prime Minister of Sweden (b. 1871)
 June 18
 Florence Bascom, American geologist and educator (b. 1862)
 Simon Bolivar Buckner Jr., American general (killed in action at Okinawa) (b. 1886)
 Friedrich, Prince of Wied, German prince (b. 1872)
 June 20
 Robert Crewe-Milnes, 1st Marquess of Crewe, British politician (b. 1858)
 Luís Fernando de Orleans y Borbón, Spanish prince (b. 1888)
 June 22
 Isamu Chō, Japanese general (ritual suicide) (b. 1895)
 Mitsuru Ushijima, Japanese general (ritual suicide) (b. 1887)
 June 24 – José Gutiérrez Solana, Spanish painter (b. 1886)
 June 27 – Emil Hácha, 3rd President of Czechoslovakia, State President of Protectorate of Bohemia and Moravia (b. 1872)
 June 30
 Germogen (Maximov), Russian Orthodox Metropolitan (b. 1861)
 Gabriel El-Registan, Soviet poet (b. 1899)

July
 July 1 – Félix Evaristo Mejía, Dominican diplomat, educator and writer (b. 1866)
 July 2 – Óscar R. Benavides, Peruvian field marshal, diplomat, politician and President of Peru (b. 1876)
 July 5 – John Curtin, 14th Prime Minister of Australia (b. 1885)
 July 7 – Peter To Rot, Papuan Roman Catholic layman, martyr and blessed (b. 1912)
 July 9 – Luigi Aldrovandi Marescotti, Italian politician, diplomat (b. 1876)
 July 12 
 Boris Galerkin, Russian mathematician (b. 1871)
 Wolfram Freiherr von Richthofen, German field marshal (brain tumor) (b. 1895)
 July 13 – Alla Nazimova, Russian-born American actress (b. 1879)
 July 17 – Ernst Busch, German field marshal, as prisoner of war (b. 1885)
 July 20 – Paul Valéry, French poet (b. 1871)
 July 24 – Arnold von Winckler, German general (b. 1856)
 July 25 – Malin Craig, United States Army general (b. 1875)
 July 28 – Margot Asquith, Countess of Oxford and Asquith (b. 1864)
 July 29 – Maria Pierina De Micheli, Italian Roman Catholic religious sister, mystic and blessed (b. 1890)
 July 31 – Artemio Ricarte, Filipino general (b. 1866)

August
 August 1 – Blas Cabrera Felipe, Spanish physicist (b. 1878)
 August 2 – Pietro Mascagni, Italian composer (b. 1863)
 August 3 – Roman Kochanowski, Polish painter, illustrator (b. 1857)
 August 4 – Gerhard Gentzen, German mathematician and logician (starvation in prison camp) (b. 1909)
 August 5 – Nat Jaffe, American swing jazz pianist (b. 1918)
 August 8 – Joseph Pujol, Le Pétomane, French flatulist (b. 1857)
 August 7 – Jacques Vaillant de Guélis, British/French WWII hero (injuries received in automobile accident) (b. 1907)
 August 9
 Harry Hillman, American track athlete (b. 1881)
 Jun Tosaka, Japanese philosopher (in prison) (b. 1900)
 August 10 – Robert H. Goddard, American rocket scientist (b. 1882)
 August 12 – Karl Leisner, German Roman Catholic priest and blessed (b. 1915)
 August 15
 Korechika Anami, Japanese general (ritual suicide) (b. 1887)
 Matome Ugaki, Japanese admiral (killed in action) (b. 1890)
 August 16 – Takijirō Ōnishi, Japanese admiral (ritual suicide) (b. 1891)
 August 18
 Subhas Chandra Bose, Leader of Indian National Army (Third-degree burns from aircrash) (b. 1897)
 Sarala Devi Chaudhurani, Indian educationist (b. 1872)
 August 19 – Tomás Burgos, Chilean philanthropist (b. 1875)
 August 22 – Mustafa Al-Maraghi, Egyptian reformer (b. 1881)
 August 24 – Shizuichi Tanaka, Japanese general (suicide) (b. 1887)
 August 25
 John Birch, American missionary for whom the John Birch Society is named (killed in action) (b. 1918)
 Willis Augustus Lee, American admiral, Olympic shooter (b. 1888)
 Thomas F. Woodlock, editor of The Wall Street Journal and Interstate Commerce Commission commissioner (b. 1866)
 August 26
 Pio Collivadino, Argentinian painter (b. 1869)
 Franz Werfel, Austrian writer (b. 1890)
 August 27 – Blessed María Pilar Izquierdo Albero, Spanish Roman Catholic religious professed (b. 1906)
 August 29 – Fritz Pfleumer, German engineer, inventor (b. 1881)
 August 30 – Florencio Harmodio Arosemena, 6th President of Panama (b. 1872)
 August 31
 Stefan Banach, Polish mathematician (b. 1892)
 Pope Macarius III of Alexandria, Egyptian patriarch, saint (b. 1872)

September
 September 6
 Witold Leon Czartoryski, Polish nobleman (b. 1864)
 John S. McCain Sr., American admiral (b. 1884)
 September 9 – Aage Bertelsen, Danish painter (b. 1873)
 September 12 – Hajime Sugiyama, Japanese general (suicide) (b. 1880)
 September 15
 Richard Friedrich Johannes Pfeiffer, German physician and bacteriologist (b. 1858)
 André Tardieu, 3-time prime minister of France (b. 1876)
 Anton Webern, Austrian composer (b. 1883)
 Zhang Mingqi, Qing dynasty politician (b. 1875)
 September 16 – John McCormack, Irish tenor (b. 1884)
 September 18
 José Agripino Barnet, Cuban politician and diplomat, acting President of Cuba (b. 1864)
 Blind Willie Johnson, American gospel blues singer (b. 1897)
 September 20
 Augusto Tasso Fragoso, Brazilian soldier, statesman and Interim President of Brazil (b. 1869)
 Eduard Wirths, German doctor, chief SS doctor at Auschwitz concentration camp (suicide) (b. 1909)
 September 24 – Hans Geiger, German physicist, inventor (b. 1882)
 September 25 – Plutarco Elías Calles, Mexican general and president (1924-1928), known as Jefe Maximo ("Maximum Boss") (b. 1877)
 September 26
 Béla Bartók, Hungarian composer (b. 1881)
 Kiyoshi Miki, Japanese philosopher (b. 1897)

October
 October 1 – Walter Bradford Cannon, American physiologist (b. 1871)
 October 6
 Leonardo Conti, German physician, Nazi officer (suicide) (b. 1900)
 Hans Vogel, chairman of the Social Democratic Party of Germany (SPD) (b. 1881)
 October 8 – Felix Salten, Austrian author (b. 1869)
 October 10 – Joseph Darnand, Vichy French politician (executed) (b. 1897)
 October 12 – Dmytro Antonovych, Soviet politician (b. 1877)
 October 13 – Milton S. Hershey, American chocolate tycoon (b. 1857)
 October 15 – Pierre Laval, French politician, 2-time Prime Minister of France (executed) (b. 1883)
 October 18 – Frederick Hovey, American tennis player (b. 1868)
 October 19
 Plutarco Elías Calles, Mexican general, politician and 40th President of Mexico (b. 1877)
 N. C. Wyeth, American illustrator (b. 1882)
 October 21 
 Henry Armetta, Italian actor (b. 1888)
 Felicija Bortkevičienė, Lithuanian politician and publisher  (b. 1873)
 October 24 – Vidkun Quisling, Norwegian Nazi collaborator (executed) (b. 1887)
 October 25 – Robert Ley, German Nazi politician (suicide) (b. 1890)
 October 26
 Adolf von Brudermann, Austro-Hungarian general (b. 1854)
 Paul Pelliot, French explorer (b. 1878)
 October 30 – Xian Xinghai, Chinese composer (b. 1905)
 October 31
 Henry Ainley, British actor (b. 1879)
 Ignacio Zuloaga, Basque Spanish painter (b. 1870)

November
 November 8 – August von Mackensen, German field marshal (b. 1849)
 November 11 – Jerome Kern, American composer (b. 1885)
 November 13 – Sir Edwyn Alexander-Sinclair, British admiral (b. 1865)
 November 16 – Sigurður Eggerz, Minister for Iceland during World War I and 2nd Prime Minister of Iceland (b. 1875)
 November 17 – Frederick Francis IV, Grand Duke of Mecklenburg-Schwerin (b. 1882)
 November 20 – Francis William Aston, British chemist, Nobel Prize laureate (b. 1877)
 November 21
 Robert Benchley, American humorist, theater critic and actor (b. 1889)
 Ellen Glasgow, American novelist (b. 1873)
 Alexander Patch, United States Army lieutenant general, World War II army commander (b. 1889)
 Jimmy Quinn, Scottish footballer (b. 1878)
 November 23 – Charles Coborn, British singer (b. 1852) 
 November 27 – Josep Maria Sert, Spanish Catalan muralist (b. 1874)
 November 28 – Dwight F. Davis, American tennis player (b. 1879)
 November 30 – Shigeru Honjō, Japanese general (suicide) (b. 1876)

December
 December 1 – Anton Dostler, German general (b. 1891)
 December 3 – George McKay, Soviet-born American actor (b. 1884)
 December 4
 Thomas Hunt Morgan, American biologist, geneticist, embryologist and Nobel Prize in Physiology recipient (b. 1866)
 Richárd Weisz, Hungarian Olympic champion wrestler (b. 1879)
 December 5 – Cosmo Gordon Lang, Archbishop of Canterbury (b. 1864)
 December 8 – Gabriellino D'Annunzio, Italian actor, director and screenwriter (b. 1886)
 December 12 – Prince Frederick of Schaumburg-Lippe (b. 1868)
 December 13
 Juana Bormann, German Nazi concentration camp guard (executed) (b. 1893)
 Henri Dentz, French general (b. 1881)
 Irma Grese, German warden at Bergen-Belsen concentration camp (executed) (b. 1923)
 Josef Kramer, German commandant of Bergen-Belsen concentration camp (executed) (b. 1906)
 Elisabeth Volkenrath, German supervisor at Nazi concentration camps (executed) (b. 1919)
 December 14 – Forrester Harvey, Irish actor (b. 1884)
 December 16
 Giovanni Agnelli, Italian entrepreneur, founder of Fiat (b. 1866)
 Fumimaro Konoe, Japanese general, politician and 23rd Prime Minister of Japan (b. 1891)
 December 21 – George S. Patton, American general (injuries from automobile accident) (b. 1885)
 December 22 – Otto Neurath, Austrian philosopher, political economist (b. 1892)
 December 25 – Duy Tân, Emperor of Vietnam (b. 1900)
 December 26 – Roger Keyes, 1st Baron Keyes, British admiral (b. 1872)
 December 28 – Theodore Dreiser, American novelist (b. 1871)

Nobel Prizes

 Physics – Wolfgang Pauli
 Chemistry – Artturi Ilmari Virtanen
 Physiology or Medicine – Sir Alexander Fleming, Ernst Chain, Howard Florey
 Literature – Gabriela Mistral
 Peace – Cordell Hull

References

Further reading
 Ian Buruma. Year Zero: A History of 1945 (Penguin Press; 2013) 368 pages; covers liberation, revenge, decolonization, and the rise of the United Nations. excerpt
  International News Service, It Happened In 1945 The Essential Year Book (1946)
 Keith Lowe. Savage Continent: Europe in the Aftermath of World War II (2012) excerpt and text search
 McDannald, A. H. ed. The Americana Annual 1946 (1946) events of 1945  online; encyclopedia yearbook global coverage in 950pp
 Walter Yust, ed. 10 Eventful Years, 1937 – 1946 Chicago: Encyclopædia Britannica, 1947, 4 vol., encyclopedia yearbook online